The Journal of Cancer Survivorship is a bimonthly peer-reviewed medical journal covering oncology nursing with respect to cancer survivors. It was established in 2007 to improve knowledge and health care of cancer survivors and is published by Springer Science+Business Media. The editor-in-chief is Michael Feuerstein (Uniformed Services University of the Health Sciences). According to the Journal Citation Reports, the journal has a 2020 impact factor of 4.442.

References

External links

Oncology nursing journals
Publications established in 2007
Bimonthly journals
Springer Science+Business Media academic journals
English-language journals